Muzaffar, Muzaffer, or Mozaffar ("the Victorious") may refer to:

People

Given name
Al-Muzaffar Umar (died 1191), Ayyubid prince of Hama and a general of Saladin
Muzaffar Shah of Malacca (ruled 1445–1459), sultan of Malacca
Muzaffar II of Johor (1546–1570), Sultan of Johor
Mozaffar al-Din Shah Qajar (1853–1907), Qajarid Shah of Persia
Muzaffar Ahmed (economist) (1936–2012), Bangladeshi economist
Muzaffar Ahmed (politician) (1889–1973), Bengali politician, journalist and communist activist
Mozaffar Alam (1882–1973), Iranian governor and politician
Muzaffar Alam (born 1947), American linguist
Muzaffar Ali (born 1944), Indian filmmaker
Muzaffer Atac (1933–2010)
Muzaffar Hussain Baig, Indian politician
Mozaffar Firouz (1906–1988)
Muzaffar Hassan (1920–2012), Pakistani naval officer
Muzaffar Hussain (disambiguation)
Muzaffar Iqbal (born 1954), Pakistani-Canadian scientist and philosopher
Muzaffer İzgü (born 1933), Turkish writer and teacher
Muzaffer Ozak (1916–1985), Turkish Dervish
Muzaffar Ali Khan Qizilbash, Pakistani politician
Muzaffar Hussain Shah (born 1945), Pakistani politician
Muzafer Sherif (1906–1988), Turkish social psychologist
Muzaffar Warsi (1933–2011), Pakistani Urdu poet, critic and essayist

Middle name
Mirza Muzaffar Ahmad (1913–2002), Pakistani civil servant and member of the Ahmadiyya Muslim Community
Muhyi ad-Din Muzaffar Jang Hidayat (died 1751), ruler of Hyderabad
Sultan Muzaffar Khan (fl. ca. 1652), ruler of Bengal
Shamsuddin Muzaffar Shah (died 1494), ruler of Bengal

Surname
Abd al-Malik al-Muzaffar (died 1008), hajib of Cordoba
Bahram Muzaffer (born 1986), Turkish boxer
Nasirli Muzaffar (1902–1944), Talysh poet, folklorist, linguist, teacher and journalist
Chandra Muzaffar (born 1947), Malaysian political scientist
Habbus al-Muzaffar (died 1038), ruler of Taifa of Granada
Mu'nis al-Muzaffar (845/6–933), Abbasid general and strongman

Places
Mozaffar, Iran, a village in Razavi Khorasan Province, Iran

Other 
Mozaffar (film), a 1974 Iranian comedy film directed by Masoud Zelli

See also 
Muzaffarabad, capital of Azad Kashmir
Muzaffargarh, city in Punjab, Pakistan
Muzaffargarh District, Punjab, Pakistan
Muzaffarnagar, city in Uttar Pradesh, India
Muzaffarnagar district, Uttar Pradesh, India
Muzaffarpur, city in Bihar, India
Muzaffarpur district, Bihar, India
Muzaffar Pur, village in Punjab, Pakistan
Muzaffar (Pakistan) a village in Sialkot District of Punjab, Pakistan,
Müzəffəroba, village in Khachmaz District, Azerbaijan
Sekolah Menengah Sains Muzaffar Syah, school in Malaysia
Baghe Mozaffar, Iranian satirical television series
Muzaffar Dynasty, second ruling dynasty of the Sultanate of Mogadishu
Muzaffar Ahmed (disambiguation)

Arabic masculine given names
Turkish masculine given names